Dargai (Malakand-II) Hydropower Plant (MHPP-II) is a small, low-head, run-of-the-river hydroelectric power generation station of about 20 megawatt generation capacity (four units of 5.0 MW each), located at Dargai, Malakand District, KPK province of Pakistan on the flows of Swat River and about 210 km from Pakistan's Capital Islamabad, 45 km from the city of Mardan. It is a small hydel power generating plant constructed and put in commercial operation in December 1952 generating Average Annual yield of 162 million units (GWh) of much needed least expensive electricity.

Salient Technical Features
Installed Capacity: 20 MW (4 Units of 5.0 MW each)
Annual Net Electrical Output: 162 GWh 
Design Discharge: 34 m3/s (8.5 m3/s per unit) 
Rated Net: Head 76.8 m 
Generation Voltage: 11 kV 
Transmission Voltage: 132 kV

See also 

 List of dams and reservoirs in Pakistan
 List of power stations in Pakistan
 Khan Khwar Hydropower Project
 Satpara Dam
 Gomal Zam Dam
 Duber Khwar hydropower project

References 

Dams completed in 1952
Hydroelectric power stations in Pakistan
Run-of-the-river power stations
Dams in Pakistan
1952 establishments in Pakistan
Energy infrastructure completed in 1952